Fathabad (also Romanized as Fatḩābād) is a village in Zahray-ye Pain Rural District, in the Central District of Buin Zahra County, Qazvin Province, Iran. At the 2006 census, its population was 976, in 220 families.

References 

Populated places in Buin Zahra County